Truth or Dare? is a 1986 slasher film written by Tim Ritter, and based on his short "Truth or Dare?" from 1985 anthology film Twisted Illusions.

Plot 

Mike Strauber, a businessman with a history of mental illness, walks in on his wife, Sharon, having sex with Jerry, his best friend. Mike storms off, and wanders aimlessly as he contemplates suicide while flashing back to his time with Sharon, and a childhood incident where he cut himself with a razor while playing 'truth or dare?'

Mike picks up a female hitchhiker, and the two go to a campsite, where they play 'truth or dare?' The game turns violent and ends when a park ranger finds Mike, who had mutilated himself at the behest of the hitchhiker, who was just a hallucination.

Mike is admitted to the Sunnyville Mental Institution and is released over a year later due to good behavior, overcrowding, and budget cuts. Immediately after being discharged, Mike tracks down and murders Jerry and is readmitted to Sunnyville after being wounded while trying to kill Sharon. Once back in Sunnyville, Mike hallucinates playing 'truth or dare?' with two disfigured patients and cuts most of his own face off with a knife he had smuggled into the facility. Five months later, Mike, who has taken to wearing a frowning copper mask, goes berserk in his room after an employee taunts him by giving him a picture of Sharon. When an orderly tries to calm him, Mike stabs the man in the eye with a pencil, then escapes the institution, hijacking a car full of weapons on his way out.

Mike goes on a rampage, indiscriminately slaughtering men, women, and children on his way to Sharon's house. Realizing where Mike is going, Detective Rosenberg and Doctor Thorne head there, with Thorne arriving first. Thorne is unable to save Sharon and is killed in a shootout with Mike. Rosenberg happens upon Mike, bleeding heavily from being shot by Thorne and manages to talk him down and disarm him. Mike is taken by paramedics and placed back in Sunnyville.

Cast 

 John Brace as Mike Strauber
 Mary Fanaro as Sharon Strauber
 Bruce Gold as Jerry Powers
 AJ McLean as Young Mike Strauber
 Priscilla Duff as Mrs. Strauber
 Kerry Ellen Walker as Hitch-Hiker
 D.C. Goff as Park Ranger
 Rick Paige as Doctor Burt Thorne
 Mona Jones as Doctor Emma Evans
 Bruce Paquette as Garage Attendant
 Edward L. Elliott II as Man-Next-Door
 Therese C. Elliott as Woman-Next-Door
 Raymond Carbone as Detective Jon K. Rosenberg
 Geoffrey Miller as Wes
 Tami Smith as Doctor Bachman
 Norm Rosenbaum as Bald Man
 Asbestos Felt as Warty Man/Newscaster Voice
 Anthony T. Townes as Steve
 Joel D. Wynkoop as Guard #2
 Pam Weitzman as Woman With Carriage
 Terence Andreucci as Officer Pournelle
 Richard K. Day as Officer Down
 Si Stillerman as Medical Examiner
 Scott Weitzman as Baseball Player
 Angelina Rodell as Old Lady

Production 

Truth or Dare? had a budget of $200,000, was shot on 16 mm film, and was made specifically for the direct-to-video market. Writer and director Tim Ritter was seventeen when the script was sold, and eighteen at the time of the film's production.  It was shot on location in Palm Beach County, Florida. In the making-of documentary, Celluloid Carnage: The Making of Truth or Dare?, Tim Ritter states that tensions between himself and the producers of the film ultimately lead to him being removed from production on the first day of filming and directorial duties were taken over by  producer Yale Wilson.

Reception 

Tom Becker of DVD Verdict wrote that Truth or Dare? was "a typical, entertaining, and typically entertaining low-budget, direct-to-home-video '80s slasher/horror entry. It contains all the requisites: some nudity, lots of violence (some graphic, all cheesy), a masked madman, and plot holes so glaring, it seems like big chunks of the film are just missing (they aren't)". Film Threat declared the film had nothing going for it except nostalgia. Elijah Wood has called it one of his favorite films and says "And I've introduced it to so many people and it has its fans."

Sequels 

The film was followed by four sequels, all of them written and directed by Tim Ritter, and released direct-to-video. They are 1994's Wicked Games, 1998's Screaming for Sanity: Truth or Dare 3, 2011's Deadly Dares: Truth or Dare Part IV, and 2017's I Dared You! Truth or Dare Part 5. Funds were raised for the fifth film by Ritter and Scott Tepperman through the crowdsourcing website Indiegogo. I Dared You! saw its official DVD release in March 2018.

An unofficial sequel called Writer's Block (subtitled Truth or Dare 2 in some versions) was released by Dead Alive Productions in 1995.

References

External links 
 

1986 films
American slasher films
1986 horror films
1980s slasher films
Camcorder films
Adultery in films
American films about revenge
Films set in Florida
Films shot in Florida
Mass murder in fiction
American police detective films
1986 direct-to-video films
American independent films
Direct-to-video horror films
Films directed by Tim Ritter
Features based on short films
Films set in psychiatric hospitals
Films about psychiatry
1980s English-language films
1980s American films